Charles Wing Gray (1845 – 23 November 1920) was a British farmer and a Conservative Party politician.

He was the Member of Parliament for Maldon in Essex from 1886 to 1892.

From 1885 to 1890 he served as a captain in the 2nd Volunteer Battalion of the Essex Regiment.

References

External links 
 

1845 births
1920 deaths
Conservative Party (UK) MPs for English constituencies
UK MPs 1886–1892
Essex Regiment officers
People from Chelmsford
Members of Parliament for Maldon